The đàn lục huyền cầm (chữ Nôm: 彈六絃琴) (literally "lute with six strings"), or colloquially đàn ghi-ta phím lõm (literally ghi-ta "guitar", + phím "fret", + lõm "sunken"), is a scalloped Vietnamese adaptation of the French guitar.

The guitar, or ghi-ta, was adopted by Vietnamese musicians during the 19th Century. However, in order to adapt a western guitar to the deep pressing on the strings necessary for Vietnamese music the fingerboard - the wood of the neck between the frets - was scooped out to ease the pressing. This carving out of the fingerboard is what gives the distinctive scalloped appearance to the six-string đàn lục huyền cầm. This form of guitar is commonly used in cải lương or "Southern Reformed Theater." In the modern day, it has been included in Chầu văn music. Traditionally, acoustic guitars are used, but electric guitars are increasingly popular in the modern day.

Some guitarist's will use Artificial harmonics in order to imitate the sound of the Đàn bầu.

References

External links
Page with pictures of the scooped out neck. Text in Vietnamese.
A video of a traditional ensemble where the guitarist does multiple techniques, including the imitation of a Dan Bau

Vietnamese musical instruments
Guitars